Seznec is a surname of Breton origin. It may refer to any the following people:

Seznec derives from saezh which means sunbeam or arrow in Breton and the suffix -eg is very frequently used to form names designating a place by what is found there.
 André Seznec, French engineer
 Jean Seznec  (1905–1983), French historian and mythographer
 Jean-François Seznec, French political scientist 
 Christian Seznec (born 1952), French professional road bicycle racer
 Reynald Seznec (born 1953), President and CEO of the Franco -Italian company Thales Alenia Space
Marie Seznec Martinez (born 1958), French fashion design and ex-model
 Bruno Seznec (born 1965), French audio engineer
 Guillaume Seznec, charged and imprisoned in the Seznec Affair, a controversial French court case of 1923-1924.

References

Surnames of Breton origin
Breton-language surnames